
Country Jam is an annual music festival in the Western Slope of Colorado, United States, which started in 1992. It is the largest country music and camping festival in the state.

Country Jam is a four-day "rain or shine" event. The festival is held at the Country Jam Ranch, a  ranch and music festival concert venue located in Loma, Colorado near the towns of Mack and Grand Junction the Grand Valley (Colorado-Utah).  Many attendees stay in the festival's campground area. 

The festival is estimated to have an $11 million annual impact on the local economy, according to a study by Colorado Mesa University

Country Jam previous lineups have included some of the biggest names in country music.

In the 2017 festival, Old Dominion debuted three new songs, reported Taste of Country, which also said few artists "do a sing-along like Old Dominion. "Said Nobody," "Beer Can in a Truck Bed" and their version of Sam Hunt's "Make You Miss Me" (co-written by Ramsey) filled the Grand Valley as the sun went from yellow to a deep orange."

The 2019 festival featured Alabama and others.

See also
Country Jam USA, in Wisconsin

References

External links

Country music festivals in the United States
Music festivals in Colorado
Music venues in Colorado
Tourist attractions in Mesa County, Colorado